Ulrich Braun  is a retired German football midfielder who played for Schwarz-Weiß Essen, Arminia Bielefeld and FC Gütersloh 2000.

Domestic League Records

References

External links
 Ulrich Braun at fussball.de 
 

1941 births
Living people
German footballers
Arminia Bielefeld players
Bundesliga players
2. Bundesliga players
Association football midfielders